Ran Chandnani (born 1930) is an Indian water polo player. He competed in the men's tournament at the 1952 Summer Olympics.

References

1930 births
Living people
Indian male water polo players
Olympic water polo players of India
Water polo players at the 1952 Summer Olympics
Place of birth missing (living people)